The 1986 Mississippi State Bulldogs football team represented Mississippi State University as member of the Southeastern Conference (SEC) during the 1986 NCAA Division I-A football season. Rockey Felker by first-year head coach Rockey Felker, the Bulldogs compiled a record of 6–5 with a mark of 2–4 in conference play, placing in a three-way tie for seventh in the SEC.

Schedule

References

Mississippi State
Mississippi State Bulldogs football seasons
Mississippi State Bulldogs football